Catherine Simone Barma (born 26 October 1945) is a French television producer. She is of Italian origin, and the daughter of director Claude Barma. She is known for the comedy series On n'demande qu'à en rire, which she produces, presented by Laurent Ruquier and in which she appeared as a jury member.

References

External links
 

1945 births
Living people
French television producers
Women television producers
People from Nice
French people of Italian descent